Californium polyborate is a covalent compound with formula Cf[B6O8(OH)5]. In this compound the californium is in a +3 oxidation state.

Californium polyborate is unusual in that californium is covalently bound to the borate. Californium was expected to resemble lanthanide elements in being highly ionic. The polyborate anion is polarisable and flexible. The 5f, 6d, 7s, and 7p orbitals of californium are all involved on the bonding. Most valence electrons are in the 5f orbital, and a significant fraction in the 6d orbital, and smaller fractions of one electron are in the 7s and 7p orbitals.

Formation
Californium(III) polyborate can be made by autoclaving a californium(III) chloride solution in water with excess boric acid for a week at 240°C. This is then cooled slowly to room temperature for another three days. Water dissolves excess boric acid to leave insoluble crystals of the borate.

Properties
The californium(III) polyborate solid undergoes a green fluorescence of 525 nm with ultraviolet light of wavelengths 365 or 420 nm. There is also an invisible near infrared fluorescence at 1020 nm induced by green light at 546 nm.

Safety
Californium polyborate is dangerous because of the radioactivity of californium and its decay daughter curium.  Between them these elements emit α particles, gamma rays and neutrons.

References

Californium compounds
Borates